This page shows the results of the Judo Competition for men and women at the 2002 South American Games, with the finals held on Sunday August 4, 2002 in Rio de Janeiro, Brazil.

Men's competition

Super-Lightweight (– 55 kg)

Extra-Lightweight (– 60 kg)

Half-Lightweight (– 66 kg)

Lightweight (– 73 kg)

Half-Middleweight (– 81 kg)

Middleweight (– 90 kg)

Half-Heavyweight (– 100 kg)

Heavyweight (+ 100 kg)

Open Class

Women's competition

Super-Lightweight (– 44 kg)

Extra-Lightweight (– 48 kg)

Half-Lightweight (– 52 kg)

Lightweight (– 57 kg)

Half-Middleweight (– 63 kg)

Middleweight (– 70 kg)

Half-Heavyweight (– 78 kg)

Heavyweight (+ 78 kg)

Open Class

References

External links
 Results
 Results - Women
 Results - Men

2002 South American Games events
S
2002
Judo competitions in Brazil